The Waco Tribune Herald Ladies Classic was a golf tournament on the LPGA Tour from 1966 to 1973. It was played at the Lake Waco Country Club in Waco, Texas.

Winners
Waco Tribune Herald Ladies Classic
1973 Kathy Whitworth

Quality First Classic
1972 Sandra Haynie
1971 Judy Rankin

Quality Chek'd Classic
1970 Kathy Whitworth
1969 Mary Mills
1968 Carol Mann
1967 Margie Masters

The Success Open
1966 Clifford Ann Creed

References

Former LPGA Tour events
Recurring sporting events established in 1966
Recurring events disestablished in 1973
Golf in Texas
Sports in Waco, Texas
1966 establishments in Texas
1973 disestablishments in Texas
Women's sports in Texas